Anthony Storr (18 May 1920 – 17 March 2001) was an English psychiatrist, psychoanalyst, and author.

Background and education
Born in London, Storr was educated at Winchester College, Christ's College, Cambridge, and Westminster Hospital. He was in the first cohort of medics to train in Jungian analysis at the Society of Analytical Psychology in London.

Career
In 1974, Storr moved from private practice to a teaching appointment at the Warneford Hospital in Oxford, until his retirement in 1984.

Personal
Storr was, as one of his obituarists observed, "no stranger to suffering at formative stages of his life." He married twice, to Catherine Cole (who became a children's writer under her married name) in 1942 and writer Catherine Peters in 1970 after the first marriage ended in divorce.

Distinctions 
 Emeritus Fellow of Green College (1984)
 Fellow of the Royal Society of Literature (1990) 
 Honorary FRCPsych (1993)

Works 
In his books, Storr explored the secrets of the dark sides of the human psyche – sexual deviations (Sexual Deviation, 1964), aggression (Human Aggression, 1968), and destructiveness (Human Destructiveness, 1972). At the same time, he saw the possibility of creative use of these spontaneous drives and directing them towards sports, scientific and artistic feats (The Dynamics of Creation, 1972).

In his book Music and the mind  Storr explores various theories on  the origins of music.

In chapter 3 of the book Storr writes:
Although music is sometimes referred to as a universal language, this is an entirely misleading description. The difficulty of appreciating music from different periods of history or from different cultures is a powerful argument in favour of the view that the various types of music are predominantly cultural artefacts rather than based on natural  phenomena.

In his final book Feet of Clay; Saints, Sinners, and Madmen: The Power and Charisma of Gurus (1996) Storr tracks typical patterns, often involving psychotic disorders that shape the development of the guru. He challenges Jesus' mental health by implying that there are psychological similarities between crazy "messiahs" such as Jim Jones, David Koresh, and respected religious leaders, including Jesus. His study is an attempt to look at Jesus as one of many gurus.

Publications
 The Integrity of the Personality (1961) 
 Sexual Deviation (1964) 
 Human Aggression (1968) 
 Human Destructiveness (1972) 
 The Dynamics of Creation (1972) 
 Jung (1973)  
 The Essential Jung (1983) 
 The School of Genius (1988) 
 Solitude: A Return to the Self (1988)  — paperback retitling of The School of Genius
 Freud (1989)  
 The Art of Psychotherapy (1979, 1980)  
 Churchill's Black Dog, Kafka's Mice, and Other Phenomena of the Human Mind (1990) 
 Human Destructiveness: The Roots of Genocide and Human Cruelty (1991)  – fully revised edition of Human Destructiveness
 Music and the Mind (1992) 
 Feet of Clay; Saints, Sinners, and Madmen: A Study of Gurus (1996)  
 The Essential Jung: Selected Writings (1998)  – another edition of The Essential Jung
 Freud: A Very Short Introduction (2001)  – another edition of Freud

See also

 Richard Webster
 Sadism and masochism in fiction
 Sexual abuse by yoga gurus
 The Assault on Truth

References

Further reading
 Obituary, The Times, 20 March 2001.
 Anthony Storr, 80, Psychiatrist and Writer
 An article on Anthony Storr's life and work in Clio's Psyche

1920 births
2001 deaths
Medical doctors from London
People educated at Winchester College
Alumni of Christ's College, Cambridge
English psychiatrists
British psychoanalysts
Jungian psychologists
Fellows of Green Templeton College, Oxford
English non-fiction writers